José Manuel Díaz Novoa (born 1 January 1944), known as Novoa, is a Spanish retired footballer who played as a forward, and a manager.

Novoa spent the most of his playing and managerial career linked with Sporting Gijón, but also managed other La Liga sides such as Celta, Real Burgos and Espanyol.

Playing career
Born in Gijón, Asturias, Novoa made his professional debut with hometown side Sporting de Gijón during the 1962–63 season, in the Copa del Generalísimo. In 1967, he moved to fellow Segunda División side RC Celta de Vigo, helping in their promotion to La Liga in 1969.

Novoa made his debut in the top tier of Spanish football on 21 September 1969, playing the last 21 minutes in a 1–1 home draw against CE Sabadell FC. He moved to Tercera División side Real Avilés CF in the following year, but retired in 1971 at the age of just 27 after a severe knee injury.

Managerial career
After retiring Novoa started working as a coach, being named manager of first club Sporting's B-team in 1963. For the 1979–80 season, he was named in charge of the first team.

Novoa left in June 1980, but returned to the Rojiblancos in March 1982, replacing Vicente Miera. After the first team appointed Vujadin Boškov as manager, he moved down to manage the reserves for a second spell.

Novoa return to the reins of the first team in 1984, as Boškov left for Ascoli Calcio. In April 1988, after the club decided not to renew his contract, he accepted an offer of another club he represented as a player, Celta.

Novoa was sacked by Celta in December 1989, and was appointed manager of another top tier club, Real Burgos CF, the following July. He left the club in 1992 for fellow league team RCD Espanyol.

Novoa was dismissed by the Catalans in May 1993, with his side subsequently suffering relegation. He only returned to coaching duties in January 1996, taking over Sporting for a third spell.

Novoa was named in charge of Segunda División B side Málaga CF midway through the 1996–97 campaign, replacing sacked Pepe Cayuela. He left the club in May 1997, and eventually returned to Sporting in December; with the club seriously threatened with relegation, he left the following March.

Novoa subsequently coached the Asturias autonomous team from 2000 to 2002 before retiring. He ended his career as the manager who was in charge of Sporting the most times, with a total of 371 games; 230 of them in the main category.

References

External links
 
 

1944 births
Living people
Footballers from Gijón
Spanish footballers
Association football forwards
La Liga players
Segunda División players
Sporting de Gijón players
RC Celta de Vigo players
Real Avilés CF footballers
Spanish football managers
La Liga managers
Segunda División managers
Segunda División B managers
Sporting de Gijón managers
RC Celta de Vigo managers
Real Burgos CF managers
RCD Espanyol managers
Málaga CF managers